This is a list of fictional turtles, tortoises, and terrapins  from literature, movies and other elements of popular culture.

In mythology, legends, and folklore

In literature

In comics

In film and television

In animations

In video games

As mascots, toys, and others

In politics
Post turtle
Ograbme

See also
Cultural depictions of turtles and tortoises

References

Turtles
Turtles, fictional